Mount Hermanson is an ice-covered mountain in the Queen Maud Mountains of Antarctica,  high, standing at the head of Cunningham Glacier,  southwest of Gray Peak. It was named by the Advisory Committee on Antarctic Names for Captain J.M. Hermanson, U.S. Navy, an air operations officer at McMurdo Station, 1957–58, and Chief of Staff to the U.S. Antarctic Projects Officer, 1959.

References

Mountains of the Ross Dependency
Dufek Coast